Joseph Henry Edwards (May 3, 1873 – July 27, 1911) was an American football player and coach.

Biography
Edwards was born May 3, 1873 in Boston. He attended high school at Middleborough, Massachusetts, where he was a two-year captain of the football team, graduating in 1895. For his undergraduate career, he attended Dartmouth College, graduating in 1899. He was a member of the Casque and Gauntlet secret society and Sigma Chi social fraternity.

As a collegiate athlete, he played football for Dartmouth as a Tackle, from 1895 to 1897. In 1898, Edwards served in the Spanish–American War with the 1st New Hampshire Regiment. He coached the Case School of Applied Science from 1899 to 1900, achieving a record of 3–8–4. Edwards died of apoplexy in 1911 at the age of 38.

Head coaching record

References

1873 births
1911 deaths
19th-century players of American football
American football tackles
Case Western Spartans football coaches
Dartmouth Big Green football players
People from Middleborough, Massachusetts
Coaches of American football from Massachusetts
Players of American football from Boston